Gilgan is a surname. Notable people with the surname include:

Hugh Gilgan (1852–1887), Irish baseball player

See also
Gilman (name)

Anglicised Irish-language surnames
Surnames of Irish origin